Tine Aouker  is a small town and seat of the Commune of Tilemsi in the Cercle of Gao in the Gao Region of south-eastern Mali.

References

Populated places in Gao Region